The 1983 Formula Ford Driver to Europe Series was an Australian motor racing competition open to Formula Ford racing cars.
The series, which was organised by the Light Car Club and the Formula Ford Association, was the fourteenth Australian national series for Formula Fords.

The series was won by Bruce Connolly driving a Galloway and a Van Diemen.

Schedule
The series was contested over eight rounds with one race per round.

Points system
Points were awarded on a 20-15-12-10-8-6-4-3-2-1 basis for the first ten places at each round.

Series standings

Note: All cars were powered by a mandatory 1600cc Ford pushrod engine.

References

External links
 Formula Ford, autopics.com.au

Australian Formula Ford Series
Formula Ford Driver to Europe Series